Carli Tornehave (born 26 August 1932, in Stockholm), is a Swedish singer and actor.

He has participated at Melodifestivalen six times; in 1962 he performed Anneli and När min vän, in 1963 he performed Twist till menuett and En gång i Stockholm. The song "En gång i Stockholm" won the contest, but Monica Zetterlund was appointed to represent Sweden in the Eurovision Song Contest in London. In 1966, he performed Monte Carlo and Härliga söndag ending on second and eighth place respectively.

Famous Carli Tornehave songs
Hård stad (Rough Road by Lee Hazlewood) – 1961
Angelique
Den enda i världen
En natt i Moskva
Lykkeliten
Gotländsk sommarnatt
Monte Carlo
När min vän kommer tillbaka (with Monica Zetterlund)
Under ekars djupa grönska
Mexican Shuffle

Filmography
1961 – Åsa-Nisse bland grevar och baroner
1962 – Raggargänget
1964 – Wild West Story
1965 – För vänskaps skull as the singer
1968 – Sarons ros och gubbarna i Knohult
1978 – Dante - akta're för Hajen!

References

1932 births
20th-century Swedish male singers
Melodifestivalen contestants
Singers from Stockholm
Living people